Apap or APAP may refer to:

Medical
 Paracetamol (or acetaminophen), an analgesic drug, also known as APAP from its chemical name N-acetyl-para-aminophenol
 Automatic Positive Airway Pressure, a medical device used to treat breathing disorders like sleep apnea

People
 Apap, a common surname in Malta, which originates from Gozo in the 16th century
 Antonia Apap (19th century), mother of Karmni Grima
 David Apap, 1990s Maltese politician, see List of mayors of places in Malta
 Gilles Apap (born 1963), a French violinist
 Ferdinando Apap (born 1992), Maltese soccer player
 Joseph Apap (20th century), Maltese musician, brother of William and Vincent
 Julie Apap (1948-2011), Maltese ceramicist
 Louis Apap, 1990s Maltese politician, see List of mayors of places in Malta 
 Vincent Apap (1909-2003; aka Ċensu Apap), Maltese sculptor
 William Apap (1918-1970), Maltese painter

Other uses
 Association of Performing Arts Presenters, American organisation of arts professionals

See also

 Villa Apap Bologna, Attard, Malta; the official residence of the ambassador of the US to Malta; see List of ambassadors of the United States to Malta
 AP (disambiguation)
 2AP (disambiguation)
 AP2 (disambiguation)